Mount Chyon, also known as "Gora Chen", is a mountain in the Sakha Republic (Yakutia), Russia. At  it is the highest summit in the Silyap Range, part of the central Chersky Range, East Siberian System. 

The nearest airport is Ust-Nera Airport.

See also
List of mountains and hills of Russia
List of ultras of Northeast Asia

References

External links
The highest peaks in Russia

Mountains of the Sakha Republic
Chersky Range